Darren Forward is a former professional rugby league footballer who played in the 1980s. He played for the Newcastle Knights from 1988 to 1989.

References

External links
http://www.rugbyleagueproject.org/players/Darren_Forward/summary.html

Australian rugby league players
Newcastle Knights players
South Newcastle Lions players
Living people
Year of birth missing (living people)
Place of birth missing (living people)
Rugby league props